The Fiend (also known as Beware My Brethren) is a 1972 British horror film produced and directed by Robert Hartford-Davis and starring Ann Todd, Tony Beckley and Patrick Magee. The film is set against a background of religious fanaticism and, as with other films directed by Hartford-Davis, also includes elements of the sexploitation genre of the early 1970s.

The Fiend as originally released runs for 98 minutes, but an edited version of 87 minutes (removing most of its more graphic content) was produced for the American market. The film was released on DVD in 2005; however the DVD uses the cut version.

Plot
Widow Birdy Wemys has become a devoted member of a fundamentalist fire-and-brimstone religious sect called "the Brethren", led by the charismatic Minister. Birdy has turned her sizeable home over to the Brethren for use as a church and a recruiting ground, and her son Kenny has also fallen under their spell. Kenny is a troubled individual, dominated by his overbearing mother, introverted and socially inept. He has taken the teachings of the Minister to heart, and feels repulsed by what he sees as sin, lust and temptation being openly flaunted by the young women he sees as he goes about his daily business.

The film opens with shots of a terrified young woman in a mini skirt fleeing for her life along a riverbank, interspersed with scenes of a Brethren baptism service in full swing complete with gospel-style music and the congregation working itself into a religious frenzy. The girl is finally cornered by her unseen pursuer, strangled, stripped naked and thrown into the river at the same time as a boy is symbolically submerged during the baptism service.

Kenny works two jobs, as a part-time lifeguard at a public swimming pool and a night-time security guard. He returns from his nightshift to morning newspaper headlines screaming "Third Nude Body Found!" He later goes to the swimming pool, where he sees it as part of his job description to berate female bathers for the skimpiness of their attire. Birdy meanwhile is in failing health; a diabetic, she is dependent on insulin to control her condition but has to obtain supplies surreptitiously as the use of medicine is strictly forbidden by the Brethren's beliefs. A local nurse, Brigitte, is hired to care for Birdy, against Birdy's wishes, and becomes alarmed at what she sees of the Brethren. She passes on her concerns to her sister Paddy, a campaigning journalist eager to write an exposé of religious cults. In order to infiltrate the Brethren, Paddy decides to pose as an unmarried expectant mother seeking God's forgiveness and redemption from her sins.

Kenny descends into a frenzy of killing. One day at the pool, he is outraged when a young woman removes her bikini top and later follows her home to exact retribution for her Godless ways. While on his nocturnal beat he stumbles across a prostitute servicing a client, and she too is brutally despatched. Naked female bodies turn up across London in bizarre circumstances, dropping out of a cement mixer or dangling from a meat hook.

Birdy takes such a shine to Paddy that the Minister begins to suspect a suppressed lesbian attraction. Accusing Birdy of "foul thoughts", he orders her to fast in order to cleanse her soul. Birdy slips into a diabetic coma and Paddy attempts desperately to administer an insulin shot, but is accidentally locked in the cellar by Kenny. Kenny locates a supply of insulin and rushes to his mother, but it is too late and she dies. In his grief Kenny finally finds the courage to stand up to the Minister. Having confessed his identity as the Nude Killer, he exacts vengeance by leaving the Minister crucified in his own church.

Cast

Critical reception
Brian Orndorf of Blu-ray.com wrote that the film "begins with a blast, but soon settles into a series of tedious encounters and dull supporting characters", and that it "[comes] across as a television movie that's occasionally interrupted by scenes of violence and nudity."

Home media
In November 2018, the film was restored in 2K and released on DVD and Blu-ray by Vinegar Syndrome.

References

External links
 
 
 The Fiend at British Horror Films

1972 films
1972 horror films
British horror films
British serial killer films
Films directed by Robert Hartford-Davis
1970s English-language films
1970s British films